Stenoplacosaurus is an extinct genus of glyptosaurine anguid lizards from the Eocene of Inner Mongolia, China. The genus is monotypic, containing only the species Stenoplacosaurus mongoliensis.

Taxonomy
Stenoplacosaurus was originally named Helodermoides mongoliensis by Sullivan (1979) for remains found in the Shara Murun Formation of Inner Mongolia, China. In their redescription of Placosaurus, Sullivan and Auge (2006) transferred H. mongoliensis to Placosaurus, as P. mongoliensis. However, Sullivan and Dong (2018) found it to be generically distinct from the Placosaurus type species and renamed it Stenoplacosaurus.

References

Anguids
Eocene reptiles of Asia
Eocene lepidosaurs
Fossil taxa described in 2018
Taxa named by Robert M. Sullivan